Kallithea Palais des Sports (Greek: Παλέ ντε Σπορ Καλλιθέας), is an indoor sporting arena that is located on the Greek island of Rhodes, in Faliraki, some 13 km away from Rhodes, Greece. The arena is mainly used to host basketball and volleyball games. The seating capacity of the arena is 1,400 people with permanent tier seating, and 2,000 with temporary tier seating.

History
Kallithea Palais des Sports hosted the Final Four of the 2018 Greek Volleyball Cup. The Greek basketball club, AE Kallitheas Rodou, has used the arena to host its home games. Kallithea Palais des Sports became the home arena of the Greek professional basketball team Kolossos, of the Greek Basket League, prior to the 2019–20 season.

References

External links
Image of Palais des Sports Kallithea Exterior
Image 1 of Palais des Sports Kallithea Interior
Image 2 of Palais des Sports Kallithea Interior
Image 3 of Palais des Sports Kallithea Interior
Κολοσσός: Αλλάζει έδρα τη νέα αγωνιστική περίοδο 

Basketball venues in Greece
Indoor arenas in Greece
Volleyball venues in Greece